Abdoul Karim Sylla (born 23 January 1992) is a Dutch footballer who plays as a forward for Stade Beaucairois.

Career
In May 2012, Sylla signed his first professional contract with Montpellier HSC having agreed a one-year deal with the option of two further years.

In November 2015, he joined CS Sedan Ardennes, along with his stepfather Pascal Feindouno.

In May 2016, he moved to Lithuanian side FK Atlantas, again with Feindouno.

Personal life
Sylla is the son of former professional footballer Mohamed Sylla. After his father's death he was adopted by fellow Guinean footballer Pascal Feindouno.

References

External links
 
 
 
 

1992 births
Living people
Dutch footballers
Association football midfielders
A Lyga players
Championnat National players
Championnat National 3 players
Montpellier HSC players
ÉFC Fréjus Saint-Raphaël players
Andrézieux-Bouthéon FC players
CS Sedan Ardennes players
FK Atlantas players
Stade Beaucairois players
FC Istres players
Dutch expatriate footballers
Dutch expatriate sportspeople in Lithuania
Expatriate footballers in Lithuania